Silesia is a historical region in Central Europe.

Historical territories of Silesia include:
Silesia, split between Poland, Czech Republic and Germany
Lower Silesia, split between Poland and Germany
Upper Silesia, split between Poland and the Czech Republic
Czech Silesia (sometimes Moravian Silesia), in the Czech Republic
Austrian Silesia, in the former Austrian Empire and Kingdom of Bohemia
Cieszyn Silesia or Těšín Silesia, split between Poland and the Czech Republic
Middle Silesia, in Poland

Administrative units of Silesia include:
 Duchy of Silesia (1138–1335)
 New Silesia, former Prussian province (1795–1807)
 Province of Silesia, former Prussian province (1815–1919; 1938–1941)
 Province of Lower Silesia, former Prussian province (1919–1938; 1941–1945)
 Province of Upper Silesia, former Prussian province (1919–1938; 1941–1945)
 Duchy of Upper and Lower Silesia (Austrian Silesia), former Austrian kronland (1742–1919)
 Silesian Voivodeship (1920–1939) in Second Polish Republic
 Silesian Voivodeship (1945–1950) in People's Republic of Poland
 Lower Silesian Upper Lusatia, former Saxon district (1994–2008)
 Lower Silesian Voivodeship, in Poland (1999–)
 Silesian Voivodeship, in Poland (1999–)
 Opole Voivodeship, in Poland (1999–)
 Lubusz Voivodeship, in Poland (1999–)
 Moravian-Silesian Region, in the Czech Republic (2000–)

Religious bodies 
 
Evangelical Church of Silesia, former Protestant united regional church body in Germany (1947–2004)
Silesian Evangelical Church of Augsburg Confession, a Lutheran regional church body in the Czech Republic

Other uses 

SS Silesia, several passenger and cargo ships
Silesia (cloth) A fabric used for garment linings
 Silesia, Montana

See also 
 Silesian (disambiguation)
 Upper Silesian Metropolitan Union
 Dukes of Silesia
 , a German battleship that served in both World Wars
 Schlesien (disambiguation)
 Silesia Euroregion
 Śląsk (disambiguation)